Notice Me may refer to:

 "Notice Me" (Migos song), 2018
 "Notice Me" (Sandée song), 1988
 "Notice Me", a song by SZA from the 2022 album SOS